The Grand Order of King Tomislav, or officially the Grand Order of King Tomislav with Sash and Great Morning Star (Velered kralja Tomislava s lentom i Velikom Danicom), is the highest state order of Croatia. It is usually awarded to top foreign officials for their contribution to the improvement of Croatia's good standing internationally as well as achievements in developing international relations between Croatia and their respective countries. It is awarded by the President of Croatia. The order has one class. It is named after King Tomislav of Croatia.

It was designed by Mladen Veža, and made by the Radionica primijenjenih umjetnosti from Zagreb.

Notable recipients 

 2022 -  Gabriel Boric (as President of Chile)
 2019 -  Ilir Meta (as President of Albania)
 2019 -   Ram Nath Kovind (as President of India)
 2018 -  Marcelo Rebelo de Sousa  (as President of Portugal)
 2017 -  Sabah Al-Ahmad Al-Jaber Al-Sabah (as Emir of Kuwait)
 2016 -   Rosen Plevneliev (as President of Bulgaria)
 2014 -   Margrethe II (as Queen of Denmark)
 2013 -   Bronisław Komorowski (as President of Poland)
 2013 -   Carl XVI Gustaf of Sweden  (as King of Sweden)
 2012 -   Andris Bērziņš (as President of Latvia)
 2011 -   Harald V of Norway (as King of Norway)
 2011 -   Giorgio Napolitano  (as President of Italy)
 2009 -  Tarja Halonen (as President of Finland)
 2009 -  Bamir Topi (as President of Albania)
 2009 -  Hamad bin Khalifa Al Thani (as Emir of Qatar)
 2009 -  Albert II (as Sovereign Prince of Monaco)
 2009 -  Vladimir Voronin (as President of Moldova)
 2008 -  Matthew Festing (as Grand Master of the Knights Hospitaller)
 2008 -  Ivan Gašparovič (as President of Slovakia)
 2008 -  Valdis Zatlers (as President of Latvia)
 2008 -  Lech Kaczyński (as President of Poland)
 2007 -  Alfred Moisiu (as President of Albania)
 2007 -  Viktor Yushchenko (as President of Ukraine)
 2007 -  Karolos Papoulias (as President of Greece)
 2006 -  Tassos Papadopoulos (as President of Cyprus)
 2006 -  Edward Fenech-Adami (as President of Malta)
 2005 -  Stjepan Mesić (as President of Croatia, presented to him by Vladimir Šeks, the President of Sabor)
 2004 -  Ricardo Lagos (as President of Chile)
 2003 -  Ion Iliescu (as President of Romania)
 2002 -  Tuanku Syed Sirajuddin (as King of Malaysia)
 2002 -  Ferenc Mádl (as President of Hungary)
 2002 -  Elizabeth II (as Queen of the United Kingdom)
 2001 -  Milan Kučan (as President of Slovenia)
 2001 -  Carlo Azeglio Ciampi (as President of Italy)
 2001 -  Rudolf Schuster (as President of Slovakia)
 2001 -  Nursultan Nazarbayev (as President of Kazakhstan)
 2001 -  Aleksander Kwaśniewski (as President of Poland)
 2001 -  Rexhep Meidani (as President of Albania)
 2001 -  Thomas Klestil (as President of Austria)
 2000 -  Emil Constantinescu (as President of Romania)
 1998 -  Constantinos Stephanopoulos (as President of Greece)
 1997 -  Oscar Luigi Scalfaro (as President of Italy)
 1995 -  Franjo Tuđman (as the President of Croatia, presented to him by Nedjeljko Mihanović, the President of Sabor)
 1995 -  Carlos Menem (as President of Argentina)
 1994 -  Eduardo Frei Ruiz-Tagle (as President of Chile)
 1994 -  Sami Süleyman Gündoğdu Demirel (as President of Turkey)
 1993 -  Juan Antonio Samaranch (as President of the International Olympic Committee)
 1993 -  Francesco Cossiga (as lifetime senator and 8th President of the Italian Republic)

References

Notes

Books

Further reading 
 Zakon o odlikovanjima i priznanjima Republike Hrvatske, NN 20/95 ("Law on Decorations", in Croatian)

Orders, decorations, and medals of Croatia
Awards established in 1992
King Tomislav, Grand Order
1992 establishments in Croatia